Taesheh Mahmud Nazari (also Romanized as Ta’esheh Maḩmūd Nazarī; also known as Ţā’esheh Maḩmūd, Talesheh Mahmood Nazarī, Tayesheh-Ye-Mahmūd, and Ţāyesh‘ī) is a village in Dasht-e Zahab Rural District, in the Central District of Sarpol-e Zahab County, Kermanshah Province, Iran. At the 2006 census, its population was 412, in 80 families.

References 

Populated places in Sarpol-e Zahab County